Indiana is a novel about love and marriage written by Amantine Aurore Dupin; it was the first work she published under her pseudonym George Sand. Published in April 1832, the novel blends the conventions of romanticism, realism and idealism. As the novel is set partly in France and partly in the French colony of Réunion, Sand had to base her descriptions of the colony, where she had never been, on the travel writing of her friend Jules Néraud.

Summary 

Indiana is the story's heroine, a young noblewoman descended from French colonial settlers from 
Île Bourbon (now Réunion) and currently living in France. Indiana is married to an older ex-army officer named Colonel Delmare and suffers from a variety of unknown illnesses, presumably due to the lack of passion in her life. Indiana does not love Delmare and searches for someone who will love her passionately. She overlooks her cousin Ralph, who lives with her and the colonel. As it turns out, Ralph is in love with Indiana.

When their young, handsome, and well-spoken neighbor, Raymon de Ramière, declares his interest to Indiana, she falls in love with him. Raymon has already seduced Indiana's maid, Noun, who is pregnant with his child. When Noun finds out what is going on, she drowns herself.

Indiana's husband decides that they will move to Île Bourbon. Indiana escapes the house to faithfully present herself in Raymon's apartments in the middle of the night, expecting him to accept her as his mistress in spite of society's inevitable condemnation. He at first attempts to seduce her but, on failing, rejects her once and for all. He cannot bear the thought that her will is stronger than his and writes her a letter intended to make her fall in love with him again, even though he has no intention of requiting this love.

Indiana has moved to the Island with the Colonel by the time she reads the letter. She resists the letter but finally returns to France on a perilous sea journey. When she arrives in Paris, the French Revolution of 1830 is taking place. In the meantime, Raymon has made an advantageous marriage and bought Indiana's house, where he and his wife live.

The stoic and remote Sir Ralph, whom Indiana has always seen as an 'égoiste', suddenly comes to rescue her and tell her that Colonel Delmare has died from a fever. Indiana and Ralph decide to commit suicide together by jumping into a waterfall on the Île Bourbon. But on the way home, they fall in love. Just before the suicide, they declare their love for one another and pledge that they will be married in Heaven. At the end of the novel comes a conclusion, a young adventurer's account of finding a man and woman, Ralph and Indiana, living on an isolated farm on the Island.

Themes 
The novel deals with many typical nineteenth-century novelistic themes. These include adultery, social constraint, and unfulfilled longing for romantic love. The novel is an exploration of nineteenth-century female desire complicated by class constraints and by social codes about infidelity. In another sense, the novel critiques the laws around women's equality in France. Indiana cannot leave her husband, Colonel Delmare, because she lacks the protection of the law: under the Napoleonic Code, women could not obtain property, claim ownership of their children, or divorce. Finally, the novel touches on the subordination of the colonies to the French Empire.

Main characters 
Indiana Delmare - young, attractive noblewoman trapped in a loveless marriage of convenience
Sir Ralph - Indiana’s cousin and potential suitor
Raymon de Ramière - a handsome heartless young rake who ends up being a lover of Noun and Indiana, a practical seeker of wealth.
Colonel Delmare - Indiana’s husband
Noun - lady's maid to Indiana, formerly grew up with her on the Ile de Reunion
Madame de Ramière - Raymon’s mother, a social schemer who tries to find a way to marry Indiana and Raymon
Madame de Carvajal - Indiana's wealthy and affluent aunt.

References

Project Gutenberg

External links
 
  

1832 French novels
Novels by George Sand
Novels set in France
French romance novels